Tarfawi  is a Syrian village located in Al-Hamraa Nahiyah in Hama District, Hama.  According to the Syria Central Bureau of Statistics (CBS), Tarfawi had a population of 493 in the 2004 census.

The village came under the control of the Islamic State on 3 July 2016 after a counter-attack against the Syrian Arab Army.

References 

Populated places in Hama District